Aski may refer to:
 ASKI Sport Hall
 ASKI - special accounts for inland payments (Hjalmar Schacht)